Cut Knife Airport, formerly , was located adjacent to Cut Knife, Saskatchewan, Canada.

See also 
 List of airports in Saskatchewan
 List of defunct airports in Canada

References

External links
Page about this airport on COPA's Places to Fly airport directory

Defunct airports in Saskatchewan
Cut Knife No. 439, Saskatchewan